Jorge Antonio García Rodríguez (born January 14, 1988 in Caibarién) is a Cuban sprint canoer who competed in the late 2000s. At the 2008 Summer Olympics in Beijing, he was eliminated in the semifinals of both the K-1 500 m and the K-1 1000 m events.  At the 2012 Summer Olympics he competed in the K-1 1000 m, winning the B-final.  At the 2016 Olympics, he competed with Reinier Torres in the men's K-2 1000 m.

References

Canoeists at the 2007 Pan American Games
Canoeists at the 2008 Summer Olympics
Canoeists at the 2012 Summer Olympics
Canoeists at the 2016 Summer Olympics
Canoeists at the 2011 Pan American Games
Cuban male canoeists
Living people
Olympic canoeists of Cuba
Pan American Games medalists in canoeing
Pan American Games gold medalists for Cuba
Canoeists at the 2015 Pan American Games
People from Caibarién
1988 births
Central American and Caribbean Games gold medalists for Cuba
Competitors at the 2006 Central American and Caribbean Games
Central American and Caribbean Games medalists in canoeing
Medalists at the 2011 Pan American Games
Medalists at the 2015 Pan American Games